The 1911–12 Northern Football League season was the 23rd in the history of the Northern Football League, a football competition in Northern England.

Clubs

The league featured 11 clubs which competed in the last season, along with one new club: 
 Willington

League table

References

1911-12
1911–12 in English association football leagues